Daniel Falconer is a creature, costume, armour, weapon and prop designer for films and known best for his work with Weta on The Lord of the Rings film trilogy and The Chronicles of Narnia: The Lion, the Witch and the Wardrobe. He also authored numerous books for Weta, including The World of Kong: A Natural History of Skull Island and The Hobbit: Chronicles book series, showcasing the illustrative work of the entire design department at Weta Workshop and associated Wellington film community companies.

Filmography
Special effects
 The Lord of the Rings: The Fellowship of the Ring (2001): Designer
 The Lord of the Rings: The Two Towers (2002): Designer
 The Lord of the Rings: The Return of the King (2003): Designer
 The Chronicles of Narnia: The Lion, the Witch and the Wardrobe (2005): Designer/Sculptor
 Avatar (2009): Designer
 The Hobbit: An Unexpected Journey (2012): Designer
 The Hobbit: The Desolation of Smaug (2013): Designer
 The Hobbit: The Battle of the Five Armies (2014): Designer

Art
 The Lord of the Rings: The Fellowship of the Ring (2001): Designer
 The Lord of the Rings: The Two Towers (2002): Designer
 The Lord of the Rings: The Return of the King (2003) : Designer
 The Chronicles of Narnia: The Lion, the Witch and the Wardrobe (2005): Designer/Sculptor
 Avatar (2009): Designer
 The Hobbit: An Unexpected Journey (2012): Designer
 The Hobbit: The Desolation of Smaug (2013): Designer
 The Hobbit: The Battle of the Five Armies (2014): Designer

Publications
 The World of Kong: A Natural History of Skull Island (2005): Author/Illustrator
 The Crafting of Narnia: The Art, Creatures, and Weapons from Weta Workshop (2008): Author/Illustrator
 The Art of District 9: Weta Workshop (2010): Author
 Weta: The Collector's Guide 2011 (2011): Author
 The Hobbit: An Unexpected Journey: Chronicles: Art & Design (2012): Author/Illustrator
 The Hobbit: An Unexpected Journey: Chronicles: Creatures & Characters (2013): Author
 The Hobbit: The Desolation of Smaug: Chronicles: Art & Design (2013): Author/Illustrator
 The Hobbit: The Desolation of Smaug: Chronicle Companion: Smaug: Unleashing the Dragon (2013): Author/Illustrator
 The Hobbit: The Desolation of Smaug: Chronicles: Cloaks & Daggers (2014): Author
 The Hobbit: The Battle of the Five Armies: Chronicles: Art & Design (2014): Author/Illustrator
 The Hobbit: The Battle of the Five Armies: Chronicles: The Art of War (2015): Author/Illustrator
 Middle-earth: From Script to Screen (2017): Author

References

External links
 

Living people
Tolkien artists
Year of birth missing (living people)